Double cones (DCs), known as twin cones when the two members are the same, are two cone cells (colour detecting photoreceptors) joined together that may also be coupled optically/electrically. They are the most common type of cone cells in fish, reptiles, birds, and monotremes such as the platypus and are present in most vertebrates, though they have been noted as absent in most placental mammals (including humans), elasmobranches and catfish. There are many gap junctions between the cells of fish double cones. Their function, if they have any unique function compared to single cones, is largely unknown; proposed uses include achromatic (non-colour vision) tasks such as detecting luminance, motion and polarization vision. 

Some double cones have members with same opsin (twin cones), while others have members with different cone types (members have a different spectral sensitivity). Behavioural research on the reef dwelling triggerfish Rhinecanthus aculeatus has provided evidence that individual members of double cones can act as independent channels of colour information.

In a book about vision in fishes, James Bowmaker writes that double cones tend to be sensitive to longer wavelengths of light than single cones. He also states that the single cones are usually smaller than the individual members of the double cones.

Further reading
Walls, G. L. (1942). The vertebrate eye and its adaptive radiation: Bloomfield Hills, Mich. : Cranbrook Institute of Science. esp. pp 58-63.

References

External links
University of Queensland research page (last updated 2007 but has some interesting information)

Photoreceptor cells